Cross Currents is a 1935 British comedy film directed by Adrian Brunel and starring Ian Colin, Marjorie Hume and Evelyn Foster. The film was made as a quota quickie supporting feature, for distribution by Paramount to allow them to meet the annual quota established by the British government. Much of the film was shot on location in Cornwall.

A Devon Vicar mistakenly comes under suspicion of murdering a rival in love. It was based on the novel Nine Days Blunder by Gerald Elliott.

Cast
 Ian Colin as Tony Brocklehurst
 Marjorie Hume as Mrs. Stepping-Drayton
 Evelyn Foster as Margery Weston
 Frank Birch as Rev. Eustace Hickling
 Aubrey Mallalieu as Gen. Trumpington
 Kate Saxon as Miss Cruickshank
 Aubrey Dexter as Colonel Bagge-Grant
 Bryan Powley as Cmdr. Mannering
 Sally Gray as Sally Croker

References

Bibliography
 Chibnall, Steve. Quota Quickies: The Birth of the British 'B' film. British Film Institute, 2007.
 Low, Rachael. History of the British Film: Filmmaking in 1930s Britain. George Allen & Unwin, 1985 .

External links

1935 films
1935 comedy films
British comedy films
1930s English-language films
Films directed by Adrian Brunel
Films set in Devon
Films set in England
Films produced by Anthony Havelock-Allan
British black-and-white films
British and Dominions Studios films
Films shot at Imperial Studios, Elstree
1930s British films